Crockerella constricta is a species of sea snail, a marine gastropod mollusk in the family Clathurellidae, the cone snails and their allies.

Description

Distribution

References

constricta